Lawrence "Taco" Lasalle Wallace (born April 18, 1981) is a former American football wide receiver.

College 
Wallace began his collegiate career at Mt San Antonio College in California where he started for two seasons.  He then transferred to Kansas State for his two final years.  As a senior in 2002, Wallace led the team with 39 receptions for 704 yards and five touchdowns.

Pro career 
Wallace was drafted in the 7th round by the Seattle Seahawks in the 2003 NFL Draft with the 224th overall pick.
He moved in and out of the Seahawks lineup, being at best a fifth string Wide Receiver, until he was released.
On January 26, 2007, he signed a contract with the Edmonton Eskimos of the CFL, and attended the team's training camp.  However, he did not make the team and was released.

References
pro-football-reference.com

1981 births
Living people
American football wide receivers
Edmonton Elks players
Green Bay Packers players
Kansas State Wildcats football players
People from Canoga Park, Los Angeles
Seattle Seahawks players